"Someday" is a song by Canadian pop band Glass Tiger. It was released on 1986 as the third single from their debut studio album The Thin Red Line through Capitol Records in Canada and Manhattan Records worldwide. The song was written by members Alan Frew and Al Connelly and by producer Jim Vallance. "Someday" also won a Juno Award in the category Single of the Year.

Following the success of "Don't Forget Me (When I'm Gone)", "Someday" reached No. 14 on Canada's RPM Top 100 and it was also a success in the U.S., reaching No. 7 on the Billboard Hot 100, while reaching lower positions in other countries.

Composition 
"Someday" is a mid-tempo pop rock ballad written by Alan Frew, Al Connelly and Jim Vallance. The track runs at 100 BPM and is in the key of D major. It runs at three minutes and thirty-seven seconds in the album version.

Accolades

Music video 
The music video for "Someday" was directed by Storm Thorgerson, who had also directed the "Thin Red Line" clip previously. The clip shows Alan Frew discussing with his "girlfriend" through a telephone call, alternating with scenes of the band performing the song.

Track listing

Personnel 
Credits adapted from The Thin Red Line and "Someday" liner notes.

Glass Tiger
 Alan Frew – vocals
 Al Connelly – guitars
 Sam Reid – keyboards
 Wayne Parker – bass
 Michael Hanson – drums, backing vocals

Additional musicians
 Jimmy Maelin – percussion (remix versions)

Design
 Jackie Murphy – design
 Heather Brown – design
 Beth Baptiste – photography 
 Shoot That Tiger! – design, logo design
 Koppel & Scher – design

Production
Jim Vallance – production
 Ed Thacker – mixing
 Michael Brauer – remixing
Fernando Kral – remixing assistance

Charts

Weekly charts

Year-end charts

Certifications

References 

1986 songs
1986 singles
Glass Tiger songs
Capitol Records singles
Manhattan Records singles
Juno Award for Single of the Year singles
Rock ballads